Tuntange is a small town in western Luxembourg, in the canton of Mersch.

Until 31 December 2017, it was a commune. On 1 January 2018, the commune was merged with Boevange-sur-Attert to form the new commune of Helperknapp.

Former commune
The former commune consisted of the villages:

 Ansembourg 
 Bour 
 Hollenfels 
 Marienthal 
 Tuntange (seat)
 Claushof (lieu-dit)
 Kalbacherhof (lieu-dit)
 Marienthalerhof (lieu-dit)

Coat of arms
The arms were granted on January 25, 1983.

The field with its single charge, a buckle, is derived from the arms of the Lords of Hollenfels, as the village was part of the Hollenfels Estate. The chief symbolizes the three castles in the town; the Hollenfels Castle and the Old Castle of Ansembourg and New Castle of Ansembourg.

External links 
 
 Tuntange

Former communes of Luxembourg
Towns in Luxembourg